Mimi Slinger (born 6 February 2003) is an English actress and model, known for portraying the role of Leanna Cavanagh on the ITV soap opera Emmerdale. In 2021, she was signed to Storm Management.

Early life
Slinger was born on 6 February 2003 in England. At a few months old, her family moved to Singapore where she grew up. She attended the Tanglin Trust School, where she began performing. Then at the age of eleven, Slinger and her family moved back to England. Slinger then began attending the Sylvia Young Theatre School in London, as well as attending weekend classes at ArtsEd.

Career
Slinger began singing at the age of six and later discovered musical theatre. She made her stage debut in 2014, where she appeared in a production of The Sound of Music, where she portrayed the role of Brigitta von Trapp. In 2017, Slinger made her onscreen debut in Heidi: Queen of the Mountain, in which she portrayed the role of Clara. In 2018, Slinger began appearing in the ITV soap opera Emmerdale, portraying the role of Leanna Cavanagh. In an interview with Digital Spy, Slinger stated that her character is "a troublemaker and loves the attention that comes with it." In 2021, it was announced that Slinger had been signed by modelling agency Storm Management. She left Emmerdale later that year, but expressed a desire to continue acting on television alongside her modelling ventures.

Filmography

References

External links
 
 Mimi Slinger at Storm Management

2003 births
21st-century English actresses
Alumni of the Sylvia Young Theatre School
English child actresses
English musical theatre actresses
English film actresses
English female models
English soap opera actresses
Living people
People educated at the Arts Educational Schools